Krishnamurthy Gobinathan (born 13 January 1978) is a Malaysian field hockey player. He competed in the men's tournament at the 2000 Summer Olympics. He is currently working as the head coach of Bangladesh national field hockey team.

References

External links

1978 births
Living people
Malaysian people of Tamil descent
Malaysian sportspeople of Indian descent
Malaysian male field hockey players
Olympic field hockey players of Malaysia
Field hockey players at the 2000 Summer Olympics
Place of birth missing (living people)
Commonwealth Games medallists in field hockey
Commonwealth Games silver medallists for Malaysia
Asian Games medalists in field hockey
Asian Games bronze medalists for Malaysia
Medalists at the 2002 Asian Games
Field hockey players at the 2002 Asian Games
Field hockey players at the 1998 Commonwealth Games
2002 Men's Hockey World Cup players
Medallists at the 1998 Commonwealth Games